Manul Chudasama is an Indian television actress.

Career
Manul Chudasama started her career through television commercials. Manul made her debut in television with Ek Thi Rani Ek Tha Raavan in 2019. She played the protagonist, Rani, opposite Sheezan Mohammed Khan. Later she was replaced from the series for "not being sensuous enough" claims by makers. Later on she played Princess Amrapali in Sony SAB's Tenali Rama in the same year. 

In 2022 she played lead role of Godess Radha in Dangal's Brij Ke Gopal opposite Paras Arora but it went off-air soon in the same year. 

In February 2023 she stepped into the shoes of actress Tunisha Sharma as Princess Mariam in Sony SAB's Ali Baba opposite Abhishek Nigam after Sharma's demise.

Filmography

Television

References

Living people
21st-century Indian actresses
Indian television actresses
1990s births
Indian soap opera actresses
Actresses from Mumbai
Actresses in Hindi television